Sokół Sokółka is a Polish football club that is based in Sokółka, Poland. As of the 2021–22 season, they compete in the regional league. The team's colors are blue and red.

References

External links

Association football clubs established in 1946
1946 establishments in Poland
Sokół
Sokółka County
Football clubs in Podlaskie Voivodeship